Hermann A. Eplée (December 5, 1908 – April 30, 1973) was a German politician of the Christian Democratic Union (CDU) and former member of the German Bundestag.

Life 
Eplée had been a member of the CDU since 1947. Until 1952 he was chairman of the Committee of Expellees of Lower Saxony and from 1954 to 1958 chairman of the CDU regional association Oder/Neisse, a party-internal organization of expellees. He was a member of the German Bundestag from 16 January 1953, when he succeeded the late Bernardus Povel, until the end of the legislative period a few months later, and again from 8 September 1958, when he succeeded Franz Meyers, who left the Bundestag after his election as Prime Minister of North Rhine-Westphalia. After the end of the legislative period in 1961, Eplée was no longer represented in the Bundestag.

Literature

References

1908 births
1973 deaths
Members of the Bundestag for Lower Saxony
Members of the Bundestag 1957–1961
Members of the Bundestag 1949–1953
Members of the Bundestag for the Christian Democratic Union of Germany